The Mouloudia Club of Lakouablia is a Moroccan football club currently playing in the La Région Ligue. The club was founded on 21 October 1950.

References

Football clubs in Morocco
1950 establishments in Morocco